KXTU-LD (channel 57) is a low-power television station in Colorado Springs, Colorado, United States, serving Southern Colorado with programming from The CW. It is owned and operated by network majority owner Nexstar Media Group alongside Fox affiliate KXRM-TV (channel 21). Both stations share studios on Wooten Road in Colorado Springs, while KXTU-LD's transmitter is located on Cheyenne Mountain.

The station is simulcast in high definition on KXRM-TV's second digital subchannel. This signal increases KXTU's broadcasting radius; KXTU did not convert to digital until 2010, and even in digital, its coverage area is effectively limited to El Paso and Pueblo counties.

History
The station signed on as KXTU-LP on November 5, 1999, as a UPN affiliate under the brand of UPN57.

When UPN left the air on September 17, 2006, KXTU switched to The CW, which was created by the merger of The WB (which had been available in the market by way of Denver's KWGN-TV) and UPN.

Unlike most other low-powered stations, KXTU is available to viewers on DirecTV and Dish Network, as well as on cable systems throughout southern Colorado. This is because under the retransmission consent portion of the must-carry rules, KXRM has the right to require cable and satellite providers to carry KXTU as part of the compensation for carrying KXRM.

On August 30, 2010, KXTU-LP flash-cut from analog to digital on channel 57. On October 27, 2010, it changed its call sign to KXTU-LD.

In early 2012, the station moved from channel 57 to channel 20 and rebranded from CW 57 to SOCO CW.

On February 28, 2013, Barrington Broadcasting announced the sale of its entire group, including KXTU-LD, to Sinclair Broadcast Group. The sale was completed on November 25.

On August 20, 2014, Sinclair announced that it would sell KXRM-TV and KXTU-LD, along with WTTA in Tampa Bay and WHTM in Harrisburg, to Media General in a swap for WJAR in Providence, Rhode Island, WLUK-TV and WCWF in Green Bay, Wisconsin, and WTGS in Savannah, Georgia. The swap is part of Media General's merger with LIN Media. WHTM's sale of Media General was explored nearly two months earlier, and it was completed, nearly three months before the Media General/LIN deal was completed. The sale was completed on December 19. A condition of the sale maintained the station's affiliation with Sinclair's American Sports Network package of college sports.

Digital television

Digital channels
The station's digital signal is multiplexed:

The station carried programming from MundoFox/MundoMax on its second subchannel throughout its three-year existence from August 2013 until December 2016.
The station launched Antenna TV in June 2020.

News programming
Unlike its sister station, KXTU does not air newscasts, but during a breaking news event or weather bump, it simulcasts KXRM's coverage.

References

External links
 SOCO CW

XTU-LD
The CW affiliates
Bounce TV affiliates
Laff (TV network) affiliates
Antenna TV affiliates
Low-power television stations in the United States
Nexstar Media Group
Television channels and stations established in 1999
1999 establishments in Colorado